Bruno Weber Park is a sculpture park in the Swiss municipalities Spreitenbach and Dietikon, and besides the Fahr Abbey one of the visitor attractions in the Limmat Valley. The sculpture garden is designed as a Gesamtkunstwerk of the Swiss artist Bruno Weber (1931–2011).

Architecture 
Over the years, it was decorated with dozens of columns, reliefs, heads and gargoyles. A  tower at the entrance area and the estate tower were also built, being landmarks overlooking the Limmat Valley. The family's estate was re-built in a "fairy-tale castle", with colorful mosaics and decorated animal sculptures. The Wassergarten was opened in May 2012 and is surrounded by two  "wing dogs" (Flügelhund) forming a footbridge, including a ballroom for events to the west. The Crawler is still not really finished, as well as the biggest project that previously existed only on paper: three oversized caterpillars on the water garden room. A few years ago, the ETH Zurich faculty prepared a feasibility study, but it was still not realized.

Although Bruno Weber began his artistic career as a painter and graphic artist, he is best known for his concrete sculptures that are some of the main attractions of the park. Since 1966 that material started to dominate his future work, because only concrete allowed Bruno Weber to realize his visions impressive. In addition, the choice of that material is closely related to the construction activity in the Limmat Valley as a kind of counterpoint; the same stuff of many apartment blocks were built in the valley in the 1960s and 1970s. Two dragon figures (one male and one female specimen) mark the entrance into the magic forest across from the Weber's family house. That sculpture treats a motif running through Weber's entire work – the balance between woman and man. The dragon gate in the sculpture park is the prototype of the so-called Drachentor sculpture, that represented Switzerland at the World Expo 1992 in Seville. The first stones in the sculpture park, however, were already laid, as Weber Antoni saw Gaudí's Park Güell in Barcelona for the first time.

Also thousands of mosaic tiles adorn the sculptures of Bruno Weber. At the estate's own water source, opposite of the Weber house, in the early 1970s the artist built a fountain called the Source Goddess. It is one of the first concrete sculptures made by Weber, and he called it "his Indian character".

The interior decoration of the "ballsall" respectively Wassergartenhaus and of the villa was done by Bruno Weber and partially by his wife. The so-called Flügelhund is a beton structure and may be used as a footbridge overlooking nearly the whole garden, except the area in the forest to the northwest.

Facilities 

Bruno Weber Park is situated on the Weinberg hill towards the Heitersberg mountain, i.e. in the west of Dietikon respectively in the south of Spreitenbach. It can be reached by public buses in Dietikon respectively Spreitenbach to Gjuchstrasse or preferred by Bus 325 from Dietikon Bahnhof to Weinberg stop, or by foot in about 30 minutes from Dietikon railway station. In 2006, the municipalities of Spreitenbach and Dietikon inaugurated a road – Bruno Weber Weg – leading from Dietikon station to the Bruno Weber Park.

As of October 2014 the park has around 20 men and women working there, most of them volunteering, and a core staff of four. Before the final situation was getting worse, the staff planned to establish permanent atelier rooms for rental to artists and to have a place for the mosaics, furniture and small sculptures still made by the park's team.

History 
Starting in 1962 Bruno Weber created the sculpture park in the vicinity of his former studio and residence in the municipality of Dietikon in the canton of Zurich. Bruno Weber, Mrs Mariann Weber-Godo and in latter years her daughter Mrs Rebecca Piperio-Weber, and since the early years Mr Jimmy Kryeziu expanded the park by constantly integrating new sculptures, mosaics and buildings. Since 1976 Bruno Weber was in dispute with the authorities of the municipalities Dietikon and Spreitenbach, because of the illegally constructed structures and the sculptures in the forest which is part of the park. Finally received a lump sum, all buildings and structures got the official approval in 1998. In the same year Bruno Weber crafted some more sculptures leading from outside the area to the park, to make the access easier and more 'visible' for visitors.

The Bruno-Weber-Stiftung (a foundation according to Swiss law) was founded in 1990 to grant the financial support and to exercise the administration issues. The foundation should also ensure the completion of the long-time-planned Wassergarten (water garden, inaugurated in 2012) as the centerpiece of the park, and grant the long-term financing of its operation, that temporarily failed in spring 2014. After Bruno Weber's death in 2011, Mariann Weber-Godo sat down with the twin daughters for the preservation and continuation of the life work of her husband. The government of the Canton of Aargau approved in May 2014 no further operating subsidies and "attested to the work of the artist in the grounds although a regional, but not even necessarily a cantonal importance".

In 1998 the park was transformed into a unique special Zone for artistic creation within Switzerland to legalize the infrastructure; in 2003 the rezoning was approved by the Spreitenbach community meeting and in 2005 by the canton of Aargau. The legal problems comprise restrictions which do not allow to use the full potential of activities on the ground, p.e. events to establish new incomes therefore are limited. Since Bruno Weber's death in October 2011, the ownership and use conditions of the parks have been fixed by a contract between the family and the board of trustees. The artist's widow, who lives in the house in the sculpture park since 1969, was instrumental in establishing of her husband's work.

Despite of 20,000 visitors per year, the trustee announced on 22 August 2014 therefore to close the park on 20 October 2014, Among others, Guido Magnaguagno, an art expert and the former director of the Tinguely Museum, judged the sculpture garden as a "Monument national". and urgently renovations and maintaining could not be performed. The trustee's board hoped for a reorganization and continuation of the park, including the needed support of more sponsors and donations. The garden is therefore supported by the Freunde des Bruno Weber Parks (friends of Bruno Weber Park) society, local and national politicians and artists, among them Franz Hohler, and as of mid-October 2014 by a wide variety of reports in the national newspapers and television, as well by two petitions and by public support in the social media. Mrs Mariann Weber-Godo (the family still owns 2/3 of the park) told in an interview on Swiss television on 19 October 2014, that she is confident that a solution to the continued operation of the sculpture garden may be found. On 3 November 2014 the election of a new board of the Bruno Weber foundation occurred, to avert the impending liquidation of the foundation and the garden's definitive closure. According to the first media release, it was unclear when the Bruno Weber Park may be opened again, but the board of trustees initially started to provide structural reforms and develop new concepts. The re-established three-person board of trustees, presides by Mrs Isabelle Cart, owns the full confidence by the Weber family, as Mrs Weber also confirmed. Indeed, the initiative started by the friends of Bruno Weber Park and the petition, which resulted in 11,340 signatures to 3 October 2014, and subsequently collected 4,286 votes, in overall, 15,626 people have signed the petition and may have saved the Bruno Weber Park. Bruno Weber Park is saved, titled Schweiz aktuell its broadcast on 13 January 2015 – the garden was re-opened on 4 April 2015. The weekend on 4/5 April 2015, although the weather was stormy, attracted about 700 visitors.

Legal and financial situation 
However, notwithstanding that the park temporarily was closed, the interest in the population is huge, and to succeed, a new board of trustees was formed, but also the financial base needs to be improved; due to the structural and financial problems, the former trustees stepped in for one, and therefore the closure of the park was proclaimed in autumn 2014.

Bruno Weber Park is saved, titled Schweiz aktuell its broadcast on 13 January 2015, but the financial situation remains tense, and the new board of trustees is looking for more sponsors. The three-person board of trustees, presides by Mrs Isabelle Cart, owns the full confidence by the Weber family. The master plan presented on 31 March 2015 includes the renovation of the cement sculptures of the water garden within the next two years, hence, temporarily some of the sculptures are not accessible to the public when the park was re-opened on 4 April 2015, and, despite the entry fee had to be raised. The renovation of the infrastructure and the consolidation of the financial base are set on the schedule of the new board of trustees to 2018 respectively 2022. As of September 2015, the canton of Aargau still stops its financial support, unless a master plan will be presented by the board of trustees. The sculptures and structures, exposed for decades to wind and weather, must be rehabilitated, by overall an investment requirement of 2 to 2.5 million Swiss Francs; at least 250,000 Swiss Francs immediately, and additional 200,000 Swiss Francs a year are needed for longtime operation of the Bruno Weber Park.

Renovation of the park 
As of July 2015 a fireproof repository for non-sculptural art by Bruno Weber was established, consisting of paintings, drawings and graphics. By the end of 2015 the hall of the water garden will be divided and the workshop set up, and about half a million Swiss Francs will be spent on various tasks. The new board also has determined the medium-term to long-term planning: By 2018 the infrastructure for the preservation of the park will be provided. At the same time, the structure of the archives will be established, the double pyramid will be relocated, and the renovation of paths and squares will be carried out. By 2022 it is planned to open the park for overnight visits, including artificial lighting, renovation of buildings, pavilions and villa. Likewise, the production of sculptures should be restarted. By 2026 the park hopefully will be declared as a national monument. Similarly, the six-day operation should be started, the renovation of the house completed and a café should be opened. Until 2036 further renovations of the park, even enlargements by visions of Bruno Weber, will be scheduled.

The foundation collected donations of 250,000 Swiss Francs (CHF) instead of scheduled CHF 500,000 in 2015, according to the foundation, this was pleasing due to the ongoing restructuring, and in addition, the patronage practically had to be completely rebuilt. During 100 opening days the park attracted more than 23,000 visitors. An inventory of all work by Bruno Weber, including drawings and sketches, was started, but due to the large amount of Weber's works will take much time.

Trivia 

Literature 
 Hans-Ruedi Bramaz, edited by Stefan Howald, designed by Helen Ebert. With contributions by Franz Hohler, Fritz Billeter, Peter K. Wehrli, Roman Hocke, Helene Arnet, Peter Conrad, and a foreword by Christine Egerszegi-Obrist: Bruno Weber: Die Kraft der Phantasie. Ein Lebenswerk. Hirmer Verlag, Munich, .
 Peter K. Wehrli, photographs by Robert Elter: Bruno Weber - Der Architekt seiner Träume. Benteli, 2002, .

Awards (excerpt) 
 1999–2001: Werkbeiträge Migros
 2006: Bruno Weber Weg

References

External links 

  (widely in German)

Buildings and structures in Aargau
Buildings and structures in the canton of Zürich
1998 establishments in Switzerland
Sculpture gardens, trails and parks in Europe
Rural tourism
Spreitenbach
Dietikon
1962 establishments in Switzerland
Visionary environments
Tourist attractions in the canton of Zürich
Tourist attractions in Aargau